Meadow thistle is a common name for several thistles and may refer to:

Cirsium dissectum, native to Europe
Cirsium scariosum, native to North America